The Bavarian Soviet Republic, or Munich Soviet Republic, was a short-lived unrecognised socialist state in Bavaria during the German Revolution of 1918–1919. It took the form of a workers' council republic. Its name is also sometimes rendered in English as the Bavarian Council Republic; the German term  means a republic of councils or committees, and council or committee is also the meaning of the Russian word .  It was established in April 1919 after the demise of Kurt Eisner's People's State of Bavaria and sought to establish a socialist republic in Bavaria. It was overthrown less than a month later by elements of the German Army and the paramilitary . Several individuals involved in its overthrow later joined the Nazi Party during its subsequent rise to power.

Background
The roots of the republic lay in the German Empire's defeat in the First World War and the social tensions that came to a head shortly thereafter. From this chaos erupted the German Revolution of 1918. At the end of October 1918, German sailors began a series of revolts in Kiel and other naval ports. In early November, these disturbances spread civil unrest across Germany. On 7 November 1918, the first anniversary of the Russian revolution, King Ludwig III of Bavaria fled from the Residenz Palace in Munich with his family, and Kurt Eisner, a politician of the Independent Social Democratic Party of Germany (USPD), became  of a newly proclaimed People's State of Bavaria.

Though he advocated a socialist republic, Eisner distanced himself from the Russian Bolsheviks, declaring that his government would protect property rights. As the new government was unable to provide basic services, Eisner's USPD was defeated in the January 1919 election, coming in sixth place. On 21 February 1919, as he was on his way to parliament to announce his resignation, he was shot dead by the right-wing nationalist Anton Graf von Arco auf Valley, also known as Arco-Valley.

After Eisner's assassination, the Landtag convened, and Erhard Auer – the leader of the Social Democrats and the Minister of the Interior in Eisner's government – began to eulogize Eisner, but rumours had already begun to spread that Auer was behind the assassination. Acting on these false allegations, Alois Linder, a saloon waiter who was a fervent supporter of Eisner, shot Auer twice with a rifle, seriously wounding him. This prompted other armed supporters of Eisner to open fire, causing a melee, killing one delegate and provoking nervous breakdowns in at least two ministers. There was effectively no government in Bavaria thereafter.

Unrest and lawlessness followed. The assassination of Eisner created a martyr for the leftist cause and prompted demonstrations, the closing of the University of Munich, the kidnapping of aristocrats, and the forced pealing of church bells. The support for the Left was greater than Eisner himself had been able to command.

On 7 March 1919, the Socialists' new leader, Johannes Hoffmann, an anti-militarist and former schoolteacher, patched together a parliamentary coalition government, but a month later, on the night of 6–7 April, Communists and anarchists, energized by the news of a communist revolution in Hungary, declared a Soviet Republic, with Ernst Toller as chief of state. Toller called on the nonexistent "Bavarian Red Army" to support the new dictatorship of the proletariat and ruthlessly deal with any counter-revolutionary behavior.

The Hoffmann government fled to Bamberg in Northern Bavaria, which it declared the new seat of government.

Ernst Toller government
Initially, the Bavarian Soviet Republic was ruled by USPD members such as Ernst Toller, and anarchists like writer Gustav Landauer, merchant Silvio Gesell, and playwright Erich Mühsam. Toller, who was also a playwright, described the revolution as the "Bavarian Revolution of Love". Among the café society of Schwabing, the new government became known as "the regime of the coffeehouse anarchists."

Toller's government members were not always well-chosen. For instance, the Foreign Affairs Deputy Dr. Franz Lipp – who had been admitted several times to psychiatric hospitals – declared war on Württemberg and Switzerland over the Swiss refusal to lend 60 locomotives to the Republic. He also claimed to be well acquainted with Pope Benedict XV and informed Vladimir Lenin and the Pope by cable that the ousted former Minister-President Hoffmann had fled to Bamberg and taken the key to the ministry toilet with him.

Other Toller appointments included: as commissar for military affairs, a former waiter; a burglar with a conviction for moral turpitude as police president of Munich; as commissar for transportation a part-time railroad track maintenance worker; and – in Catholic Bavaria, where nuns ran the schools – a Jew as minister for education. Toller's minister for public housing published a decree saying that no house could thereafter contain more than three rooms and that the living room must always be above the kitchen and bedroom. One minister declared that capitalism would be brought down by making money free, referring to Silvio Gesell's concept of Freigeld.

Eugen Leviné government

On Saturday 12 April 1919, only six days into Toller's regime, the Communist Party seized power, led by three Russian Bolsheviks, with Eugen Leviné as head of state and Max Levien as the chairman  of the Bavarian KPD. The Communists managed to secure power after the so called , where the counter-revolutionary government forces were suppressed by the Bavarian Red Army commander Rudolf Egelhofer. 

Having received the blessings of Lenin – who at the annual May Day celebration in Red Square said: "The liberated working class is celebrating its anniversary not only in Soviet Russia but in ... Soviet Bavaria" – Leviné began to enact more hardline communist reforms, which included forming a "Red Army" from factory workers, seizing cash, food supplies, and privately owned guns, expropriating luxurious apartments and giving them to the homeless and placing factories under the ownership and control of their workers. One of Munich's main churches was taken over and made into a revolutionary temple which would be presided over by "Goddess Reason." Bavaria was to be in the vanguard of the Bolshevization of Europe, with all workers to receive military training.

Leviné also had plans to abolish paper money and reform the education system but never had time to implement them. There was time, however, for Max Levien, following Lenin's orders, to arrest aristocrats and members of the middle-class as hostages.

During Leviné's short reign, food shortages quickly became a problem, especially the absence of milk. Public criticism over the milk shortage turned political, precipitating the communist government to publicly declare: "What does it matter? ... Most of it goes to the children of the bourgeoisie anyway. We are not interested in keeping them alive. No harm if they die – they’d only grow into enemies of the proletariat."

An attempt by troops loyal to the Hoffmann government and the paramilitary  (combat league) of the Neopagan and  Thule Society, to overthrow the BSR on 13 April, was put down by the new Red Army, which consisted of factory workers and members of the soldiers' and workers' councils. Twenty men died in the fighting.

Military clash and demise
The rival governments – Hoffmann's People's State of Bavaria seated in Bamberg, and the Bavarian Soviet Republic located in Munich – clashed militarily at Dachau on 18 April when Hoffmann's 8,000 soldiers met the Soviet Republic's 30,000. The BSR forces – led by Ernst Toller – were victorious in the first battle at Dachau, but Hoffmann made a deal that gave him the services of 20,000 men of the Freikorps under Lt. General Burghard von Oven. Oven and the Freikorps, along with Hoffmann's loyalist elements of the German Army – called the "White Guards of Capitalism" by the communists – then took Dachau and surrounded Munich.  Supporters of the BSR had, in the meantime, on 26 April, occupied the rooms of the Thule Society in the Hotel Vier Jahreszeiten, and arrested Countess Hella von Westarp, the society's secretary, and six others, to be held as hostages. Egelhofer, panicked by Munich being surrounded by Hoffmann's forces, had these seven and three other hostages executed on 30 April. They included the well-connected Prince Gustav of Thurn and Taxis. The executions were carried out despite Toller's efforts to prevent them.

The Freikorps broke through the Munich defences on 1 May, leading to bitter street fighting that involved "flame-throwers, heavy artillery, armoured vehicles, even aircraft". At least 606 people were killed, of whom 335 were civilians. Leviné was later condemned to death for treason, and shot by a firing squad in Stadelheim Prison. Gustav Landauer was killed by the Freikorps, and the Bavarian Red Army commander Rudolf Egelhofer was murdered without trial after being arrested as well. Numerous others were given prison sentences, such as Toller (5 years) and the anarchist writer Erich Mühsam (15 years); others received longer sentences, 6,000 years' worth in all, some of it to hard labour.

After the trials and the execution of 1,000–1,200 Communists and anarchists, Oven declared the city to have been secured on 6 May, ending the reign of the Bavarian Soviet Republic. Although the Hoffmann government was nominally restored, the actual power in Munich had shifted to the Right.

The Bamberg Constitution was enacted on 14 August 1919, creating the Free State of Bavaria within the new Weimar Republic.

Aftermath
The immediate effect of the existence of the People's State of Bavaria and the Bavarian Soviet Republic was to inculcate in the Bavarian people hatred of left-wing rule. They recalled the period in which both states existed as one of privation, shortages, censorship, restrictions on their freedom, general chaos, violence, and disorder. Like the similarly named period following the French Revolution, the Bavarian Soviet Republic was referred to as  die Schreckensherrschaft ("The Reign of Terror"). These memories continued to be reinforced by anti-communist propaganda not only in Bavaria but throughout the Weimar Republic, where Rotes Bayern ("Red Bavaria") was held up as an example of the danger of the far-left. In this way, the right-wing parties were able to use the fears of those who had lived through both socialist states. The many separate strands of Bavarian conservatism found a common enemy in the far-left, and the former Kingdom became profoundly "reactionary, anti-Republican, [and] counter-revolutionary."

The Left itself was permanently divided following the demise of the two states, through the mutual hatred between the Far-Left Communist Party of Germany (KPD) and the Center-Left Social Democratic Party (SPD). The SPD leadership were fully aware that the Communist Party was fully controlled by the Soviet Politburo through the Comintern. Meanwhile, the KPD, under Moscow’s orders, regarded the SPD's belief in Social democracy, rather than in the violent seizure of absolute power as in the Bolshevik Revolution, as Social fascism. This hostility existed throughout Germany and prevented coalition talks between both parties in order to keep the Nazi Party from taking power in 1933. 

The division also outlived Nazism and continued to divide the German Left until the Peaceful Revolution led to the collapse of the Marxist-Leninist Government of the German Democratic Republic in October 1989.

Notable people
Active participants in the Freikorps units – those of Oven, Franz Ritter von Epp, and Hermann Erhardt – that suppressed the Bavarian Soviet Republic included future powerful members of the Nazi Party, including Rudolf Hess, a member of the Freikorps Epp.

One notable supporter of the Soviet Republic was the artist Georg Schrimpf, then aged 30, who was arrested when the movement was crushed. His friend, the writer Oskar Maria Graf,  who was also arrested, wrote about the events in his autobiographical novel, Wir sind Gefangene (1927). The famed anarchist novelist Ret Marut (later known as B.Traven) was an active participant in the establishment of Soviet power and worked as head of the Press Department of the Soviet Republic. During the early days of the Soviet Republic, representatives of cultural life also played an important role in the revolution. Some intellectuals such as the economist Lujo Brentano, the conductor Bruno Walter and the writers Heinrich Mann and Rainer Maria Rilke formed the Rat der geistigen Arbeit (Council of Intellectual Work) with Mann as its chairman.

Adolf Hitler's longstanding chauffeur and first leader of the Schutzstaffel (SS) Julius Schreck signed up and served as a member of the Red Army in late April 1919. Balthasar Brandmayer, one of Hitler's closest wartime friends, remarked "how he at first welcomed the end of the monarchies" and the establishment of the republic in Bavaria.

Adolf Hitler himself acted as a liaison between his army battalion – he had been elected "deputy battalion representative" – and the Soviet's Department of Propaganda by soldiers who mostly supported the mainstream SPD as opposed to the more radical USPD. Both film footage and a still photograph appear to show Hitler marching in Eisner's funeral procession.  He wears both a black mourning band and a red band showing support for the Government.  It is uncertain whether this indicated that Hitler was a true supporter of the soviet, or that he was simply taking an available opportunity not to return to his impoverished pre-war civilian life. His choice may therefore have been a tactical one, rather than one of political belief. It is also known that once the government had fallen, Hitler aligned himself with the Weimar Republic and – as part of a three-person committee assigned to investigate the behavior of his regiment's soldiers – informed on those who had shown sympathy for the Government.

Legacy
In his 1952 memoir Witness, Whittaker Chambers named Eugene Leviné as one of three people whom he most admired as he joined the CPUSA, along with Felix Dzerzhinsky and Igor Sazonov:    During the Bavarian Soviet Republic in 1919, Levine was the organizer of the Workers and Soldiers Soviets.  When the Bavarian Soviet Republic was crushed, Levine was captured and courtmartialed.  The court-martial told him:  "You are under sentence of death."  Levine answered: "We Communists are always under sentence of death."  That is another thing that it meant to be a Communist.

See also

 Alsace Soviet Republic
 Aftermath of World War I
 History of Bavaria
 Bremen Soviet Republic

 German Democratic Republic
 German Revolution
 History of Germany

 Hungarian Soviet Republic
 People's State of Bavaria – predecessor to the Bavarian Soviet Republic
 Soviet (council)

References
Notes

Bibliography
Bracher, Karl Dietrich (1970) The German Dictatorship. Steinberg, Jean (translator). New York: Penguin Books. 
Burleigh, Michael (2000) The Third Reich: A New History, New York: Hill and Wang, p. 40 

 Kershaw, Ian (1999) Hitler: 1889–1936 Hubris, New York: W.W. Norton & Company.

External links

 Lenin: Message of Greetings to the Bavarian Soviet Republic

 
States and territories disestablished in 1919
Communism in Germany
Early Soviet republics
Former countries in Europe
Former socialist republics
History of anarchism
Former states and territories of Bavaria
History of Munich
Socialism
States and territories established in 1919
German Revolution of 1918–1919
Former unrecognized countries